Leonie Gerken Schofield (born 15 February 1998) is a British freestyle skier. She competed in the 2022 Winter Olympics.

Career
Leonie Gerken Schofield won the silver medal at the 2013 FIS Freestyle Junior World Ski Championships in the moguls event. She finished 17th out of 20 competitors in the second qualifying round in the women's moguls event at the 2022 Winter Olympics, failing to qualify for the finals.

Personal life
Leonie Gerken Schofield has a twin brother Thomas and a younger sister Makayla, who are also freestyle skiers. The siblings grew up in Essex, a county in England, before moving to France at young ages. She dedicated her Olympic runs to her grandfather who had passed away before the 2022 Olympics.

References

1998 births
Living people
Freestyle skiers at the 2022 Winter Olympics
British female freestyle skiers
Olympic freestyle skiers of Great Britain
Sportspeople from Chelmsford
Twin sportspeople